KFSC-LP (94.1 FM) was a radio station licensed to broadcast in Visalia, California, United States.

KFSC-LP's license was cancelled on December 1, 2013, for failing to file an application for renewal with the Federal Communications Commission. The station was owned by Friends of Radio Grito/Proyecto Campesino.

References

External links
 

Defunct radio stations in the United States
FSC-LP
FSC-LP
Radio stations disestablished in 2013
Defunct community radio stations in the United States
2013 disestablishments in California
FSC-LP